Jerry Bowman (born March 9, 1962) is a retired NASCAR Winston Cup driver from Havre de Grace, Maryland in the United States. Bowman participated in five different Winston Cup Series seasons (1982 through 1989). In his career, Bowman raced 3,812 laps and ran  of racing. His total career earnings were $US27,820. Participating in only nineteen races, Bowman never won a race or finished in the top-ten (he failed to qualify for three different races). His best showing was at the 1985 NASCAR Winston Cup Series season where he finished the season with a position of 43rd in the championship – in addition to having had an average start of 30th place during the entire season and an average finish of 25th place.

Races with DNQ results
 1983 Daytona 500 - his first DNQ
 1984 Daytona 500 - his second DNQ
 1986 First Union 400 - his third and final DNQ

External links
 Racing Reference
 Ultimate Racing History

1962 births
Living people
NASCAR drivers
People from Havre de Grace, Maryland
Racing drivers from Maryland